The Darley Arabian (foaled c. 1700) was one of three dominant foundation sires of modern Thoroughbred horse racing bloodstock. The other two founders were the Godolphin Arabian and the Byerley Turk. This bay Arabian horse was bought in Aleppo, Syria, by Thomas Darley in 1704 and shipped to Aldby Park in England, as a present for his brother. 

One author in 1840 described Darley Arabian's arrival in England during the reign of Queen Anne as the event which "forms the great epoch from which the history of the Turf [as in "turf racing"] should be dated". 

There he stood at stud, usually private but sometimes open to outside mares. He was the leading sire in Great Britain and Ireland in 1722. By all accounts, the Darley Arabian stood about 15 hands high and was of substantial beauty and refinement.

The Darley Arabian sired the undefeated Flying Childers. He also sired Bartlett's Childers, an unraced brother of Flying Childers, who was the great-grandsire of the extremely influential Eclipse. The Darley Arabian was to become the most important sire in the history of the English Thoroughbred. His son Bulle Rock was the first Thoroughbred to be exported to America, in 1730.

Most Thoroughbreds can be traced back to Darley Arabian.  In 95% of modern Thoroughbred racehorses, the Y chromosome can be traced back to this single stallion. This is mainly through his descendant, Eclipse, who is the direct male ancestor of 95% of all thoroughbreds and in the pedigree of many of the rest.

Sire line tree

Darley Arabian
Cupid
Daedalus
Dart
Manica
Stump
Scar
Whistlejacket
Hackwood
Skipjack
Quintin
Crook
Constant Ball
Bulle Rock
Aleppo
Hobgoblin
Phantom
Bat
Hob
Full Moon
Sherborne
Rat
Trimmer
Shakespeare
King Lear
Pincher
Falstaff
Aleppo (Hamilton)
Scrutineer
Turtle
Surley
Spark
Pacolet
Bulle Rock
Young Bulle Rock
Brisk
Foxhunter (Cole)
Foxhunter (Leigh)
Moses
Surley
Bauble
Foxhunter (Chedworth)
Almanzor
Mercury
Whittington
Almanzor (Elstob)
Almanzor (Fleetwood)
Spinner
Why Not
Dragon
Childers
Commoner
Poppet
Winall
Hampton Court Childers
Blacklegs (Bingham)
Punch
Leadenheels
Blacklegs
Collier
Chub
John Trott
Chance
Firetail
Grey Childers
Plaistow
Fleec'em
Second
Ajax
Merlin
Young Merlin
Prospero
Petit Maitre
Childerkin
Leedes
Sharp
Spanking Roger
Blaze
Yellow Jack
Blacklegs (Prentice)
Sampson
Engineer
Viper
Tom Tinker
Bay Malton
Pilgrim
Cosmo
Pluto
Solon
Treasurer
Phocion
Sextus Pompeius
Star
Childers
Little David
Childers (Lee)
Grenadier
Scrub
Humble
Shales
Hip
Roundhead
Roger of the Vale
Stadtholder
Joseph Andrew
Pilot
Samson Crusoe
Whitenose
Jingle Jeff
Steady
Ball
Chuff
Snip
Snap
Snap (Hazard)
Omnium
Snap (Castle)
Snap (Latham)
Lofty
Snap (Chedworth)
Mambruello
Snipe
Metaphysician
Ancient Pistol
Creme De Barbade
Goldfinder
Faggergill
Gnawpost
Juniper
Scaramouch
Count
Mexican
Prince T'Quassaw
Tickler
Hottentot
Judgment
Osmar
Fribble
Hunter
Swiss
Corsican
Gambler
Young Snip
Oscar
Ferdinando
Childers Colt (Read)
Whitefoot
Windsor Shades
Badsworth
Crazy
Tiger
Dancing Master
Nest Gull
Smockface
Luggs
Whitelegs
Bartlett's Childers
Fig
Merry Andrew
Childers
Turpin
Kettle Bender
Prince Pretty
Grey Childers
Tom-Come-Tickle-Me
Squirt
Marske
Eclipse
Woodcock
Dominitian
Transit
Hephestion
Mungo
Narcissus
Pontifex
Pretender
Revenge
Shark
Vizard
Young Marske
Clayhall Marske
Garrick
Pontac
Lexicon
Flying Gib
Syphon
Tippler
Daisy
Sweetwilliam
Tosspot
Sweetbriar
Tipsey
Enterprise
Pastor
Clown
Streamer
Tandem
Gallantry
Nisus
Tim
Oedipus
Simon
Bumper
Sourface
Toy
Flower
Wanton Willy
Gander

See also
 List of historical horses

References

Bibliography

External links
 http://www.tbheritage.com/Portraits/DarleyArabian.html
 http://www.bloodlines.net/TB/Bios/DarleyArabian.htm
 Thoroughbred Heritage: Darley Arabian Sire Line
 Sire line for 15 generations

Arabian racehorses
Individual Arabian and part-Arabian horses
Horse racing
Foundation horse sires
1700 racehorse births